Ghislaine Roquet, CC (1926 – May 31, 2016) was a philosophy professor and a nun with the Sœurs de Sainte-Croix community in Quebec. She was appointed a Companion of the Order of Canada in 1970 for her educational work.

She is a signatory to the Parent Report which has influenced education in Quebec since its release in 1963.

She died on May 31, 2016 in Montreal, Quebec.

References

External links
Harry Palmer Gallery: Ghislaine Roquet (1984 photo)
 UQAM: 40th anniversary event for Parent Report

1926 births
2016 deaths
Academics in Quebec
Companions of the Order of Canada
20th-century Canadian nuns
21st-century Canadian nuns